Ein al-Tal Camp, or Handarat camp, is a   refugee camp near the village of Handarat, populated by Palestinians. The pre-war population of the camp was around 7,000. The entirety of the camps population was displaced during the Battle of Aleppo, and the camp sustained heavy damages.

References

Aleppo Governorate
Palestinian refugee camps in Syria
1962 establishments in Syria
Populated places established in 1962